Mochi ice cream is a confection made from Japanese mochi (pounded sticky rice) with an ice cream filling. It was invented by Japanese-American businesswoman and community activist Frances Hashimoto.

Description
Mochi ice cream is a small, round confection consisting of a delicious soft, pounded sticky rice dumpling (mochi) formed around an ice cream filling. The ice cream adds flavor and creaminess to the confection while the mochi adds sweetness and texture. The traditional ice cream flavors used are vanilla, chocolate and strawberry. Other flavors, such as Kona coffee, plum wine, green tea, and red bean, are also widely used. Mochi can also be flavored as a complement to the ice cream filling. When making mochi, it is dusted with either potato or cornstarch to keep it from caking while being formed and handled.

History
Japanese daifuku and manjū are the predecessors to mochi ice cream, commonly featuring adzuki bean filling. Due to the temperature and consistency of mochi and ice cream, both components must be modified. This is to achieve the right viscosity that will remain constant regardless of changes in temperature.

An early predecessor form of the dessert was originally produced by Lotte, as Yukimi Daifuku in 1981. The company first made the product by using a rice starch instead of sticky rice and a rice milk instead of real ice cream.

Frances Hashimoto, the former president and CEO of Mikawaya, is credited as the inventor of mochi ice cream. Hashimoto's husband, Joel Friedman, conceived the idea of taking small orbs of ice cream and wrapping them in a Japanese traditional mochi rice cake. Frances Hashimoto expanded on her husband's idea, inventing the fusion dessert now popular in the United States and elsewhere. Hashimoto introduced seven flavors in the mochi product line.

Mikawaya began production of mochi ice cream in the United States in 1993. Research and development took over a decade to evolve into the mass production form used today, due to the complex interactions of the ingredients. Trial and error was used in order to successfully pull the delicate mochi dough over the ice cream without leaving a sodden mess. Friedman explained that in order to conduct production of the ice cream, experts ranging from construction to microbiology were brought in to perfect the state-of-the-art production building.

Mikawaya debuted their Mochi Ice Cream in Hawaii in 1994. The frozen treat was so popular, it captured 15% of the novelty frozen treat market during its first four months.

Mochi ice cream gained huge popularity in the UK following a viral TikTok trend, which began in January 2021. The trend of ‘Looking for Little Moons in Big Tesco’ became a sensation, receiving 341.8M views and a surge in sales of 1400% in Tesco alone.

See also 

 My/Mochi
 Bubbies
 Yukimi Daifuku
 Snow skin mooncake
 Cream puff

References

External links

 Mikawaya's official site
 Lotte's official site (Japanese)
 The joy of mochi — June 14, 2006 Honolulu Weekly article, featuring Bubbies Homemade Ice Cream of Honolulu
 Maeda-en Mochi Ice Cream site
 
Little Moons official website

Food and drink in California
Ice cream
Japanese desserts and sweets
Rice dishes